Riley Skinner (born October 21, 1986) is a former American football quarterback. He was signed by the New York Giants as an undrafted free agent in 2010. He played college football at Wake Forest University.

College career
Skinner played high school football and basketball for The Bolles School in Jacksonville, Florida. Skinner stepped in for the injured Wake Forest University quarterback Ben Mauk after Mauk injured his arm in the first game of the 2006 season against Syracuse. Skinner proceeded to lead the Demon Deacons to a 10-2 regular season and the championship of the Atlantic Division of the Atlantic Coast Conference.  He won second-team All-Conference honors as a redshirt freshman. Skinner and the Demon Deacons won the 2006 ACC Championship game against the Georgia Tech Yellow Jackets 9-6, giving the program its first conference championship since 1970.  Skinner also played well in the Orange Bowl, but the Deacons fell to Louisville 24-13. Skinner threw for 2,051 yards and nine touchdowns, and recorded a 19-yard touchdown reception from wide receiver Nate Morton.

Skinner was named the 2006 ACC Rookie of the Year after leading the conference in passing efficiency, and he started 12 games for Wake Forest during the 2007 season, setting an ACC record for completion percentage in a season. In the 2009 season he broke the school record for touchdowns in a career vs North Carolina State with 45 touchdowns. The previous record was 44 that was held by former Wake Forest quarterbacks Brian Kuklick and Gary Schofield. Skinner threw for three touchdowns in a game against NC State. He broke the school record for completions in a career with 677 against Stanford, passing Kuklick. In 2009, he became the second ACC Quarterback to throw for more than 2,000 yards in each of his four seasons.

Statistics

Professional career

New York Giants
Skinner was signed by the New York Giants as an undrafted free agent following the 2010 NFL Draft. He was waived on June 25, 2010 and his agent, Mark Slough, announced that Skinner had decided to retire on August 18.

Broadcasting career
After getting cut by the Giants, his only NFL opportunity, Skinner became a college football analyst for the ACC Network.
He is also a weekly college football analyst for the award-winning radio broadcast "The Drill" every Thursday on 1010xl in Jacksonville, FL

References

Living people
1986 births
American football quarterbacks
New York Giants players
Wake Forest Demon Deacons football players
Bolles School alumni
Players of American football from Jacksonville, Florida